Robert Janz (Belfast December 25, 1932 - New York City October 26, 2021), was a New York-based visual artist whose work often dealt with ephemeral phenomena. His work has been described as having a "nomadic aspect", exploring "change and transience" and the tempoary quality of life.

Early life and education

Janz was vorn in Belfast, North Ireland in 1932. He was educated at the Maryland Institute College of Art, where he graduated with a MFA degree. Janz taught in London, Berlin and Spain.

Work
Janz cites the work of the 17th century Japanese Haiku poet, Basho, as an early influence for his visual art. In his 20's he was sent to prison for resisting being drafted into the military. While incarcerated, a prison occupational therapist who had studied in Japan taught him how to work in ceramics to produce stoneware bowls using ancient Japanese techniques.

In the 1970s Janz produced a series of recombinatory "stick sculptures" that could be arranged in a multiplicty of variations within a set of conceptual constraints.

Janz exhibited his work internationally in Barcelona, Belfast, Los Angeles, Chicago, Lyon, Dublin, among other locations. His work was included in three exhibitions at the Museum of Modern Art, New York, as well as White Columns, the Irish Museum of Modern Art among other venues.

Later in his life, Janz focused on producing graffiti-type works in lower Manhattan. He would reconfigure paper advertisement posters, transforming them into images of birds, flowers, faces and landscapes; he also added painted imagery and wrote on billboards in the form of wordplay poetry.

Legacy
In 2020 a documentary film was made on him, titled Janz: In the Moment.

Collections
His work is included in the collections of the Portland Art Museum, the Barcelona Museum of Contemporary Art, the Williams College Museum of Art, among other venues.

References

1932 births
2021 deaths
Artists from Belfast
20th-century American artists
Northern Ireland emigrants to the United States
Conceptual artists